The Metropolitan Cathedral of Our Lady of the Assumption (also called simply Asunción Cathedral) It is the main Catholic church in Asunción. It is located in the neighborhood La Catedral, in the historic center of the capital of Paraguay. It was the first diocese of the Río de la Plata.

The latest version of the cathedral was built during the government of Don Carlos Antonio López and inaugurated in 1845. It is dedicated to Our Lady of the Assumption, the patroness of the country's capital city. It has a high altar coated in silver. The cathedral is the seat of the metropolitan archdiocese of Asunción (in Latin: Archidioecesis Sanctissimae Assumptionis).

See also
Roman Catholicism in Paraguay

References

External links
 

1845 establishments in Paraguay
Roman Catholic churches completed in 1845
19th-century Roman Catholic church buildings in Paraguay
Roman Catholic cathedrals in Paraguay
Buildings and structures in Asunción
Tourist attractions in Asunción
Culture in Asunción